() is an Arabic title, adopted in other Islamic or Islamicate cultures, for various civil or religious officials.

As per the Persian records of medieval India, muqaddams, along with khots and chowdhurys, acted as hereditary rural intermediaries between the state and the peasantry. Originating during the Delhi Sultanate, the earliest known reference to the muqaddami system dates from the first decades of the 13th century, when Hasan Nizami wrote of a delegation of muqaddams offering gifts to Sultan Qutb ud-Din Aibak. Muqaddams were tasked with revenue collection in the areas under their jurisdiction, for which they received either 2.5% as remuneration or rent-free land equalling that amount. The socio-economic status of muqaddams varied over time; during the revenue reforms of Alauddin Khalji, many were impoverished due to the abolition of their traditional privileges. However, in other periods the muqaddams "were prosperous enough to ride on costly Arabi and Iraqi horses, wear fine clothes, and behave like members of the upper classes". Over time, muqaddams and chowdhurys took on the characteristics of landed gentry in their respective localities, with some even attaining the status of Zamindars during the Mughal period. Muqaddams could be dispossessed of their status by the state.

In the militaries of several Arab nations,  is equivalent to the Anglophone ranks of lieutenant colonel, commander and wing commander, depending on the service branch.

In Lebanon, the  s were the political leaders of their religious community. The last muqaddams disappeared in the beginning of the 17th Century.

References

Sufism
Arab culture
Arab military ranks
Bengali words and phrases